Kira Nerys  is a fictional character in the American science fiction television series Star Trek: Deep Space Nine (1993–1999). She was played by actress Nana Visitor. The character is from the fictional planet Bajor, a world which has recently emerged from a brutal foreign occupation. She was a member of the resistance, and the decades-long conflict has left her tough and uncompromising, but she is sustained by her strong faith in traditional Bajoran religion. She has been assigned to Deep Space Nine, a space station jointly operated by the United Federation of Planets and the new Bajoran government, where she serves as second in command as the ranking representative of her people.

Backstory
Per Bajoran custom, her family name, Kira, precedes her given name, Nerys. She has two brothers (Kira Reon and Kira Pohl), and her parents' names are Kira Taban (played by Thomas Kopache throughout the series) and Kira Meru (played by Leslie Hope in "Wrongs Darker than Death or Night").

The backstory of the character states that Kira Nerys was born 2343, in Dakhur province, Bajor, during the 50-year Cardassian occupation of the planet.  She was raised in a labor camp. Her family were members of the artisan caste, namely sculptors of clay, or potters. At age 13, Kira was recruited into the Shakaar resistance cell, part of an underground movement which carried out guerrilla attacks against Cardassian military and civilians with the ultimate goal of ending the occupation.

Story
Kira is assigned as the senior Bajoran Militia officer aboard Deep Space Nine (DS9), acting as the station's executive officer under the Starfleet Commander Benjamin Sisko, who commands the facility. Initially, Kira is opposed to the Federation presence on DS9, feeling that the Bajoran people should have nothing to do with the Federation, as she believes that Bajor needs to be able to stand on its own two feet, after enduring a long, brutal occupation by the Cardassians. Over time, her sentiments change and she becomes one of the strongest supporters of Bajor joining the Federation, and is a steadfast ally and friend of Sisko. She is deeply religious, which makes her relationship with Sisko somewhat complicated; not only is he her commanding officer, he is also the emissary of the Prophets, the Bajorans' gods. 

As a member of the Bajoran Militia, Kira is an invaluable help to Starfleet in its mission on DS9. She often commands Starfleet personnel as DS9's executive officer. In the third season, she also serves as the first officer of the Defiant, a Starfleet warship based at DS9, until Lieutenant Commander Worf assumes that role in the fourth season. When the Dominion recaptures Deep Space Nine at the start of the Dominion War, at the end of the fifth season, Kira remains aboard the station as liaison officer, as a result of Bajor's non-aggression pact with the Dominion. At the beginning of the sixth season, The Federation is losing the war against the Dominion and this, alongside a Vedek's suicide which she witnesses, galvanizes Kira to start plotting a resistance movement against the Dominion. The movement is eventually successful in helping Starfleet retake the station and driving the Dominion back behind enemy lines.

Towards the end of the seventh and final season, Kira is promoted to colonel and temporarily commissioned as a Starfleet commander. She plays a significant role in helping the Cardassian Resistance wage a guerrilla war against the Dominion, being sent by Sisko to Cardassia itself to teach Damar and his followers the tactics she learned during the Cardassian occupation of Bajor. At the conclusion of the war (and the end of the series), Kira takes command of DS9 after the disappearance of Sisko. She is still in command several years later as seen in the Star Trek: Lower Decks Season 3 episode, "Hear All, Trust Nothing".

Personal relationships
Kira becomes romantically involved with Bareil Antos, a prominent Bajoran vedek (cleric). Following his death, she later becomes involved with Shakaar Edon, a former resistance leader during the Cardassian occupation, who later becomes Bajor's First Minister. After a couple of years, the couple decide to end their relationship. Kira then forms a romantic relationship with the shapeshifter Odo, who had pined after her for years, though this too ends when Odo rejoins his people in the Gamma Quadrant at the conclusion of the series. Due to her alter ego depiction in the Mirror Universe it is speculated that Kira is canonically bisexual. 

Kira also becomes the surrogate mother to Kirayoshi O'Brien, the then-unborn child of Chief Engineer Miles O'Brien and his wife Keiko. When the pregnant Keiko was injured in a shuttle accident, Dr Julian Bashir saves the fetus by transporting it into Kira's womb. Kira continues to carry the fetus until birth, essentially becoming a part of the O'Brien family.

Enemies
Kira's primary antagonist is the former Cardassian head of Deep Space 9, Gul Dukat. At the beginning of the series, Kira despises Dukat for helping oversee the occupation of Bajor and takes every opportunity to antagonise him further. As the series progresses, the relationship slightly softens, particularly after Kira learns that Dukat has a half-Bajoran daughter named Ziyal whom he initially believed had been killed. Dukat's military career and status suffer when he takes Ziyal back to Cardassia Prime and he and Kira join forces to help defend both Cardassia and Deep Space 9 against a Klingon invasion. 

After Dukat, with the aid of the Dominion, reassumes command of Deep Space 9, Kira realises that he is using Ziyal to try and get close to her and, from that point onward, their relationship is chiefly adversarial. After Dukat has been driven off the station, he later contacts Kira and discloses the close relationship he had with her mother Kira Meru, which Kira confirms after using the Orb of Time to travel back to witness the beginning of the relationship, which starts due to the Cardassians needing "comfort women". Dukat and Kira have one final encounter in the seventh season when he abducts her to space station Empok Nor and reveals he has become the leader of a cult worshipping the evil Bajoran spirits known as the Pah-Wraiths. Kira only narrowly manages to stop Dukat orchestrating the deaths of his Bajoran followers through mass suicide before he transports off the station.

Kira also has a fractious relationship with Vedek (later Kai) Winn, a Bajoran religious leader who is in favour of separating her people from the influence of The Federation. In the final episode of the first season, Winn travels to Deep Space 9 in order to secretly plan the assassination of her rival (and Kira's lover) Vedek Bareil but fails (although Kira is unable to concretely prove that Winn was responsible). Kira nearly prevents Winn becoming the new Kai, but realises that doing so would reveal the truth about her predecessor Kai Opaka's role in a massacre and possibly lead Bajor into a civil war. Winn and Kira remain adversaries even when working together in Bajor's interests, especially when Winn attempts to interfere in government matters. Later in the sixth season, Kira is possessed by a Prophet and nearly defeats a rival Pah-Wraith which has possessed Jake Sisko, but Winn floods the station with chroniton radiation and the reckoning is stopped; Kira is furious that Winn has defied the will of the Prophets and that the Pah-Wraiths remain at large.

In the final season, Winn again visits the station and Kira tries to convince her to step aside as Kai. A furious Winn refuses and this drives her into the arms of Dukat as they plan to release the Pah-Wraiths together.

Non-canonical information
In the licensed Star Trek novels (which are not considered canonical by Paramount), following the conclusion of the television series Star Trek: Deep Space Nine, Kira Nerys takes charge of the Deep Space Nine space station as its permanent commanding officer. With the conclusion of the first wave of Deep Space Nine novels in Unity, Bajor finally joins the Federation, and Kira is given the Starfleet rank of Captain. Kira opens every Bajoran Orb simultaneously in a sacred place in order to defeat a monstrous enemy. This also causes the return of Benjamin Sisko from the Celestial Temple to the corporeal world.

In the 2019 documentary What We Left Behind, former showrunner Ira Steven Behr and several former writers of the series participated in a "what-if" planning session for an eighth season, where Kira has resigned from Starfleet and the Bajoran Militia and is a vedek in the Bajoran religious order.

Mirror Universe
The character of Kira Nerys also exists in the Mirror Universe. In the DS9 episode "Crossover", Kira encounters her mirror self, who is the cruel, powerful Intendant of the station (still called Terok Nor), with Elim Garak as her first officer. Kira convinces the mirror-Sisko to rebel against the Intendant-Kira and start the Terran Resistance. This group is later successful in taking command of Terok Nor and capturing the Intendant, but she manages to escape with the help of mirror-Nog. Eventually, the escaped Intendant convinces the alternate universe's Bareil Antos to travel to the regular universe in order to obtain an Orb of the Prophets. The mirror Kira falls in love with her double from the other universe. At the time, Nana Visitor dismissed the idea of her character being bisexual, saying that she intended to portray this as "total narcissism on her part. It had nothing to do with sexuality". However, later episodes continued to show her surrounded by a mixed-gender harem, and eventually depicted her being in a romantic relationship with her universe's version of Ezri Tigan.

Casting
In the early stages of planning Deep Space Nine, the series' creators wanted to bring in the Bajoran character Ensign Ro Laren, who was a recurring character in Star Trek: The Next Generation. Michelle Forbes, who had portrayed Ensign Ro, turned down the offer, so a new Bajoran character was created instead. Nana Visitor had just given birth to a baby boy mere months before she was called to audition for the role of Kira Nerys, and her becoming a mother actually shaped her decision process for accepting or turning down roles. With the character of Kira Nerys, Visitor felt "completely engaged on every level by the part".

Visitor almost turned down the role, as her manager told her "you will kill your career if you do this job." Visitor said, "By the end of the call, he had convinced me that I did want to be a part of it whether it impacted the rest of my career or not. When I read the script, I thought, 'That's a man's role. That's not for me.' Yet it was all I wanted to do. I hated every part that I had to play where I was chastising a husband or getting upset about the carpet. And I did a lot of those. Any time I could get my teeth into something, that was my flow state. That's why I was an actor. Major Kira was like Disneyland for an actor."

Scholarly reception
An article in the Journal of the American Academy of Psychoanalysis finds the character of Kira "emotionally difficult". In Star Trek and Sacred Ground: Explorations of Star Trek, Religion, and American Culture, it is noted that Kira was not shown worshipping privately until the 1997 episode "Ties of Blood and Water". On the 25th anniversary of DS9 in 2018, Daniel Holloway and Joe Otterson discussed the character at length saying, "Fan reception to the character, and to the show as a whole, ran hot and cold. Previous female "Star Trek" characters had been helpmates—a switchboard operator (Lt. Uhura in the original series), a therapist (Counselor Troi in Next Generation), a healer (Dr. Crusher in The Next Generation). None had been a war veteran with emotional skeletons. Visitor said, "Some people in the 'Star Trek' world were like, 'That's not what a woman in "Star Trek" should be. That's the wrong thing to be teaching. But what I saw her as was a woman of appetite and gray area—lots of gray area. Very fallible, but growing and trying. And that's all over television now." Holloway and Otterson suggested the character was a precursor to Michael Burnham on Star Trek: Discovery.

Popular reception
In 2016, ScreenRant rated Kira Nerys as the fourth-best character in Star Trek overall. In 2018, TheWrap rated Kira as the tenth-best character of Star Trek overall, noting her role in Star Trek: Deep Space Nine. The Hollywood Reporter noted the character's role in the season one episode "Duet" which they ranked as the 7th-best episode of series; Nana Visitor, who played Kira, praised the episode's writing.

In 2009, IGN ranked Kira as the 11th-best character of Star Trek overall. In 2018, CBR ranked Kira as the 11th-best Starfleet character of Star Trek. They elaborate that Kira in the show is not actually part of Starfleet until the last episode, in that brief time she has a big impact on the Dominion war. In 2018, TheWrap placed Kira as 10th out 39 in a ranking of main cast characters of the Star Trek franchise prior to Star Trek: Discovery.

In 2013, Slate magazine ranked Kira Nerys one of the ten best crew characters in the Star Trek franchise.

In 2016, the character of Colonel Kira was ranked as the 7th-most-important character of Starfleet within the Star Trek science fiction universe by Wired.

In 2020, ScreenRant ranked Kira one of the top 5 most likeable characters on the show.

References

External links

 Kira Nerys at StarTrek.com

Star Trek: Deep Space Nine characters
Bajorans
Television characters introduced in 1993
Fictional first officers
Fictional colonels
Fictional female majors
Fictional terrorists
Fictional women soldiers and warriors
Starfleet commanders